The 4th Crunchyroll Anime Awards were held on February 15, 2020, honoring excellence in anime from 2019. Crunchyroll announced the categories and the list of judges for the 2020 awards on December 17, while also noting that the list was still not complete. They also noted that they've increased their judges by over 50%, with more than half of them coming from outside the United States. Nominees were announced on the first day of voting, January 10. Voting ran until January 17, with the results announced on February 15. The show was hosted by WWE wrestler Xavier Woods and Tim Lyu. Several personalities in the anime community were invited to present the awards.

There were 18 categories. Best Couple was reinstated after being absent in the last two editions. Best Score, Best Drama, and Best Comedy were also reinstated after being absent in the last year's edition. Best Film and Best Continuing Series were dropped. A new category, Best Fantasy, was introduced. Carole & Tuesday, Demon Slayer: Kimetsu no Yaiba, and Vinland Saga each received nine nominations, including the Anime of the Year. Mamoru Miyano was nominated for the second straight time in the Best VA Performance (JP) award. Japanese singer Aimer received her third nomination, the second consecutive, in the Best Ending Sequence category. Australian composer Kevin Penkin received his second nomination for Best Score. Carole & Tuesdays opening and ending themes, both sung by Nai Br.XX and Celeina Ann, were nominated in their respective categories.

Demon Slayer: Kimetsu no Yaiba won the Anime of the Year award. Its main protagonist, Tanjiro Kamado, won Best Boy. He also was nominated in the Best Protagonist category, only to lost to Senku Ishigami of Dr. Stone. Demon Slayer is tied with Kaguya-sama: Love is War in receiving the most wins. Kaguya-sama also won Best Comedy and Best Ending Sequence. Vinland Saga won Best Drama, while The Promised Neverland won the inaugural Best Fantasy award. Mob Psycho 100s second season won in the Best Animation category. Canadian composer Mocky won the Best Score award for his work on Carole & Tuesday. George Wada, an anime producer and the president of Wit Studio, received the Industry Icon award.

Winners and nominees

Statistics

References

2020 awards in the United States
February 2020 events in the United States
Crunchyroll